Here Come The... EP is an EP by Butch Walker, available as a digital download from the iTunes Store since March 10, 2009. It contains four tracks, two versions of the track Here Comes The... from his album Sycamore Meadows and two new studio tracks exclusive to this release.

Track listing

References

External links 
 Here Comes The... EP on iTunes

2009 EPs
Butch Walker albums